A damper is a device that deadens, restrains, or depresses. It may refer to:

Music
 Damper pedal, a device that mutes musical tones, particularly in stringed instruments
 A mute for various brass instruments

Structure
 Damper (flow), a mechanical device in a duct or chimney that regulates airflow
 Stockbridge damper, used to suppress wind-induced vibrations on taut cables
 Tuned mass damper, a device mounted in structures to prevent discomfort, damage or structural failure by vibration

Other uses
 Damper (food), a bread of the Australian Outback
 Dashpot, a type of hydraulic or mechanical damper
 Shock absorber (British or technical use: damper), a mechanical device designed to dissipate kinetic energy
 An item of boiler technology used to regulate the fire
 In electronics, a kind of diode intended to absorb energy peaks, normally generated by inductive circuitry

See also
Damping (disambiguation)